Dasht-e Mil may refer to:
 Dasht-e Mil-e Olya
 Dasht-e Mil-e Sofla